The 4th FINA World Aquatics Championships took place from July 29-August 8, 1982, in Guayaquil, Ecuador. They featured 848 athletes, competing in four Aquatics disciplines:
Diving - 4 events (2 male, 2 female);
Swimming - 29 events (15 male, 14 female);
Synchronized Swimming - 3 events (all female); and
Water Polo - 1 event (male).

Medal table

Results

Diving

Men

Women

Swimming

Men

Women

Synchronised swimming

Water polo
Men

External links
FINA Official Website
World Swimming Championship Results

 
FINA World Aquatics Championships
World Aquatics Championships, 1982
World Aquatics
World Aquatics Championships, 1982
World Aquatics Championships
Swimming competitions in Ecuador
July 1982 sports events in South America
August 1982 sports events in South America
20th century in Guayaquil